The NUTS codes of Greece are part of the Nomenclature of Territorial Units for Statistics, an official nomenclature of the European Commission used by Eurostat for statistical purposes.

Changes

In 2011, the NUTS1 code of Greece was changed from GR to EL. GR1 was changed to EL5, GR2 to EL6, GR3 to EL3 and GR4 to EL4. The change became official per European Commission regulation No. 31/2011. With regard to the transmission of data to Eurostat, the new codes entered into force by 1 January 2012.

Following the Kallikratis territorial reform, the NUTS regions of Greece were redefined. With the region of Epirus being reclassified as part of Voreia Ellada ("Northern Greece", former EL1), and the region of Thessaly in exchange going to Kentriki Ellada ("Central Greece", former EL2), new NUTS1 codes have been assigned to both regions. Apart from that, a number of third-level divisions have been changed. The changes became official in December 2013 by European Commission regulation No. 1319/2013. With regard to the transmission of data to Eurostat, the new codes entered into force by 1 January 2015.

NUTS levels

The three NUTS levels are as follows:

NUTS codes

Per 1 January 2015, the NUTS codes for Greece are as follows:

Local administrative units

Below the NUTS levels, the two LAU (Local Administrative Units) levels are:

The LAU codes of Greece can be downloaded here: ''

See also
 Subdivisions of Greece
 ISO 3166-2 codes of Greece
 FIPS region codes of Greece

References

External links
 Hierarchical list of the Nomenclature of territorial units for statistics – NUTS and the Statistical regions of Europe
 Overview map of EU Countries – NUTS level 1
 ELLADA – NUTS level 2
 ELLADA – NUTS level 3
 Correspondence between the NUTS levels and the national administrative units
 List of current NUTS codes
 Download current NUTS codes (ODS format)
 Departments of Greece, Statoids.com

 
Greece
Nuts